Jacques Delelienne (25 November 1928 – 3 February 2020) was a Belgian athlete. He competed in the men's high jump at the 1952 Summer Olympics.

References

External links
 

1928 births
2020 deaths
Athletes (track and field) at the 1952 Summer Olympics
Belgian male high jumpers
Olympic athletes of Belgium